Jane Franklin (born 11 January 1974 in Mansfield, Victoria) is an Australian former cricket player.

Franklin played domestic cricket for the Victoria women's cricket team between 1996 and 2009. She was a member of the Victorian Spirit team that defeated the New South Wales Breakers 2–1 in the finals series of the 2004–05 Women's National Cricket League.

Franklin played one Test and four One Day Internationals for the Australia national women's cricket team. She played two domestic Women's Twenty20 cricket matches, and 105 Women's National Cricket League matches.

References

External links
 Jane Franklin at southernstars.org.au

Living people
Australia women Test cricketers
Australia women One Day International cricketers
1974 births
Sportswomen from Victoria (Australia)